is an English contract law case in which the House of Lords strongly reasserted that agreement only exists when there is a clear offer mirrored by a clear acceptance.

Facts
Manchester City Council was being run by the Conservative Party, which was operating a policy of selling council houses to the occupants. Mr Gibson applied, on a form of the council, for details of his house price and mortgage terms. In February 1971, the Treasurer replied:

The corporation may be prepared to sell the house to you at the purchase price of £2,725 less 20% = £2,180 (freehold)… This letter should not be regarded as a firm offer of a mortgage. If you would like to make formal application to buy your Council house please complete the enclosed application form and return it to me as soon as possible.

In March 1971, Mr Gibson completed the application form with the exception of the date on which his lease was to end, and returned it to the council. The Labour Party returned to power in Manchester in the May 1971 election, and halted new sales. Mr Gibson was told that he could not complete the purchase. He then sued the council, arguing that a binding contract had already come into force.

Judgment

Court of Appeal
In the Court of Appeal, Lord Denning MR held that there was a contract, because one should "look at the correspondence as a whole and at the conduct of the parties and see there from whether the parties have come to an agreement on everything that was material".

Geoffrey Lane LJ dissented, and would have held there was no contract. The council appealed.

House of Lords
The House of Lords unanimously upheld the council's appeal, so Mr Gibson did not get his house. The court held that the council's letter was not an offer, for the letter stated that "The Corporation may be prepared to sell the house to you" and that "If you would like to make formal application to buy your Council house, please complete the enclosed application form and return it to me as soon as possible." As there was never an offer available to be accepted, no contract had been formed and by extension the Council had not been in breach.

Lord Diplock said the following:

Lord Russell of Killowen agreed, and stated:

See also
Butler Machine Tool Co Ltd v Ex-Cell-O Corp Ltd [1977] EWCA Civ 9

External links
Case Brief for Gibson v. Manchester City Council
Gibson v Manchester City Council (1979) UKHL 6 (08 March 1979)

English agreement case law
House of Lords cases
1979 in British law
1979 in case law
Manchester City Council
1970s in Manchester